Nelson Guerrero (born 12 July 1962) is an Ecuadorian former footballer. He played in 13 matches for the Ecuador national football team from 1988 to 1989. He was also part of Ecuador's squad for the 1989 Copa América tournament.

References

External links
 

1962 births
Living people
Ecuadorian footballers
Ecuador international footballers
Place of birth missing (living people)
Association football forwards
S.D. Aucas footballers
L.D.U. Quito footballers
Imbabura S.C. footballers